Cergnago is a comune (municipality) in the Province of Pavia in the Italian region Lombardy, located about 45 km southwest of Milan and about 30 km west of Pavia. As of 1 January 2018, it had a population of 719 and an area of 13.6 km².

Cergnago borders the following municipalities: Mortara, Olevano di Lomellina, San Giorgio di Lomellina, Tromello, Velezzo Lomellina.

Demographic evolution

References

Cities and towns in Lombardy